California Joe is a 1943 American Western film directed by Spencer Gordon Bennet and written by Norman S. Hall. The film stars Don "Red" Barry, Wally Vernon, Helen Talbot, Twinkle Watts, Brian O'Hara and Terry Frost. The film was released on December 29, 1943, by Republic Pictures.

Plot

Cast  
Don "Red" Barry as Lieutenant Joe Weldon
Wally Vernon as Tumbleweed Smith
Helen Talbot as Judith Carteret
Twinkle Watts as Twinkle Potter
Brian O'Hara as Delancey Carteret
Terry Frost as Melborne Tommy Atkinson
LeRoy Mason as Breck Colton
Edward Earle as Colonel Burgess
Charles King as Henchman Ashley
Pierce Lyden as Henchman Harper
Edmund Cobb as Henchman
Karl Hackett as Telegrapher Potter
Bob Kortman as Henchman

References

External links
 

1943 films
1940s English-language films
American Western (genre) films
1943 Western (genre) films
Republic Pictures films
Films directed by Spencer Gordon Bennet
American black-and-white films
1940s American films